Urapakkam railway station is one of the railway stations of the Chennai Beach–Chengalpattu section of the Chennai Suburban Railway Network. It serves the neighbourhood of Urapakkam, a suburb of Chennai.

History
The lines at the station were electrified on 9 January 1965, with the electrification of the Tambaram–Chengalpattu section.

Amenities at/near railway station

The railway station is accessible from Urapakkam east through the railway station road and through the west side using the railway foot overbridge.

The station has 2 broad-gauge tracks 3rd track under construction.

The metre-gauge track is not used and has already been dismantled.

There was a staffed railway crossing that has been closed since 2013 after construction of a railway overbridge.

The railway station is moving towards computerised ticket and the station master is available from 9 AM till 11 PM. There are no platform tickets at this railway station.

The Urapakkam railway station now offers return tickets to any station on the EMU line from Chengalpet to Chennai Fort. However, there are no tickets issued to MRTS (Mass Rapid Transit System) and CMRL (Chennai Metro Rail Limited).

See also

 Chennai Suburban Railway

References

Stations of Chennai Suburban Railway
Railway stations in Kanchipuram district